The Puerto Rico Planning Board created in the May 12, 1942 during Rexford G. Tugwell's governorship as the Puerto Rico Planning, Urbanization, and Zoning Board, is the only government agency in charge of centralized planning under the American flag. Its creation was in keeping with Tugwell's New Deal philosophy that Puerto Rico should operate under a highly centralized, all-encompassing territorial government.

For decades, the Planning Board was in charge of all economic planning, land use zoning and case-by-case permitting in Puerto Rico.  In the 1970s the permitting process was delegated to another government agency, the Rules and Permits Administration (ARPE) and since the late 1990s, major cities have been taking over that role in their own jurisdictions.

Organization
The Planning Board currently has a Chair and four Associate Members, all appointed by the Governor and requiring the consent of the Puerto Rico Senate.

Presidents

The following is a list of the men and women that have served as Presidents of the Planning Board since 1942. Most are either civil engineers or urban planners certified by the American Institute of Certified Planners.

 19421955: Rafael Picó Santana
 19551960: Cándido Oliveras
 19601968: Ramón García Santiago
 19691969: Julio Vizcarrondo
 19691972: Enrique Soler Cloquell
 19731976: Rafael Alonso Alonso
 19771983: Miguel A. Rivera Ríos
 19831984: Nelson E. Soto Velázquez
 19851992: Patria G. Custodio
 19931998: Norma Burgos
 19982000: José R. Caballero Mercado
 20012001: Frederick Muhlach
 20012002: Hermenegildo Ortiz
 20022009: Angel David Rodriguez
 20092010: Héctor Morales Vargas
 20102012: Rubén Flores Marzán
 20132016: Luis García Pelatti
 20172021: María del Carmen Gordillo Pérez
 2021- at present: Manuel A.G. Hidalgo

References

External links
 

Office of the Governor of Puerto Rico
Urban planning in the United States
Public debt of Puerto Rico